Julia Musakovska is poet from Ukraine. She has been born in Lviv in 1982. She is the author of five poetry collections: "Men, Women and Children" (2015). "Hunting for Silence" (2014), "Masks" (2011), "Exhale and Inhale" (2010), "God of Freedom" (2021). Her individual poems have been translated into over 24 languages, including English, Polish, Spanish, Swedish and Norwegian, Hebrew, Chinese, etc. An article about her, On the frontlines of culture, was published in a Norwegian newspaper 5 may 2022.

Her works were published in the magazines "SHO", "Kurier Kryvbasu", "Kyivska Rus", "Chetver", RADAR, etc., in various almanacs and anthologies. She speaks Swedish. She has also done translations of Swedish poets such as Thomas Transtremera and Karin Boye into Ukrainian.

Her poem was translated to Norwegian and published on Norwegian Library web page and also filmed as YouTube
She is also an active member of PEN Ukraine.

Music

In 2016, together with director Oleksandr Fraze-Frazenko, she filmed a poetry movie "The Clay" (poems and voice by Musakovska), the premiere took Book Arsenal Festival 2016 and at Lviv Book Forum in 2017.

In 2018 she also presented a poetry and musical project "Circulation" based on her new poems together with musicians Taras Puzyr (bass guitar) and Luka-Teodor Hanulyak (percussion).

She has been published in a bilingual anthology of Ukrainian poetry "Letters from Ukraine" with her translations of modern Ukrainian poetry into English. She is guest lecturer at Ukrainian Catholic University.

Michael Patsis for Greece's largest online poetry publication name her as one of the most important six female poets voices (Oksana Kutsenko, Oksana Zabuzhko, Lyuba Yakymchuk, Iryna Shuvalova and Natalka Bilotserkivets) and Serhiy Zhadan.

Awards

 1st prize of the DICTUM poetry competition from the "Krok" publishing house (2014)
 2nd prize in the "Smoloskyp" publisher competition (2010)
 1st prize in the "Vytoky" competition from the Ostrozka Academy (2010)
 B.-I. Antonych (2009)
 "Granoslov" (2008)

References 

Ukrainian poets

1983 births
Living people